Kingman is a city in, and the county seat of, Mohave County, Arizona, United States. It is named after Lewis Kingman, an engineer for the Atlantic and Pacific Railroad.

History
Lt. Edward Fitzgerald Beale, a U.S. Navy officer in the service of the Army Corps of Topographical Engineers, was ordered by the U.S. War Department to build a federal wagon road across the 35th parallel. His secondary orders were to test the feasibility of the use of camels as pack animals in the Southwestern desert. Beale traveled through the present-day Kingman in 1857 surveying the road and in 1859 to build the road. Beale's Wagon Road became part of U.S. Route 66 and later Interstate 40. Remnants of the wagon road can still be seen in White Cliffs Canyon in Kingman.

Kingman was founded in 1882 before statehood, in Arizona Territory. Situated in the Hualapai Valley between the Cerbat and Hualapai mountain ranges, Kingman had its modest beginnings as a simple railroad siding near Beale Springs. Civil engineer Lewis Kingman supervised the building of the railroad from Winslow to Beale Springs. This spring had been used by Native Americans living in the area for centuries.

The Mohave County seat was originally located in Mohave City from 1864 to 1867. In 1865, the portion of Arizona Territory west of the Colorado River was transferred to Nevada after Nevada's statehood, and became part of Lincoln County, now Clark County, Nevada. The remaining territory of Pah-Ute County became part of Mohave County. Its seat was moved to Hardyville (now within Bullhead City) in 1867. The county seat transferred to the mining town of Cerbat in 1873, then to Mineral Park near Chloride. After some time, the county seat and all instruments were permanently moved to Kingman in 1887.

During World War II, Kingman was the site of a U.S. Army Air Force (USAAF) airfield. The Kingman Army Airfield was founded at the beginning of the war as an aerial gunnery training base. It became one of the USAAF's largest, training some 35,000 soldiers and airmen. The airfield and Kingman played a significant role in this important era of America's history. Following the war, the Kingman Airfield was one of the largest reclamation sites for obsolete military aircraft.

Postwar, Kingman experienced growth as several major employers moved into the vicinity. In 1953, Kingman was used to detain those men accused of practicing polygamy in the Short Creek raid, which was at the time one of the largest arrests in American history. In 1955, Ford Motor Company established a proving ground (now one of the Chrysler Proving Grounds) in nearby Yucca at the former Yucca Army Airfield. Several major new neighborhoods in Kingman were developed to house the skilled workers and professionals employed at the proving ground. Likewise, the development of the Mineral Park mine near adjacent Chloride, and construction of the Mohave Generating Station in nearby Laughlin, Nevada, in 1971 contributed to Kingman's population growth. Also, the location of a General Cable plant at the Kingman Airport Industrial Park provided steady employment.

Kingman explosion

The Kingman Explosion, also known as the Doxol Disaster or Kingman BLEVE, was a catastrophic boiling liquid expanding vapor explosion (BLEVE) that occurred on July 5, 1973, during a propane transfer from a Doxol railroad car to a storage tank on the Getz rail siding near Andy Devine Avenue/Route 66.

Firefighters Memorial Park in Kingman is dedicated to the 11 firefighters who died in the blaze.

1980s and on
The 1915-built Mohave County Courthouse and the county's somewhat older jail were listed on the National Register of Historic Places in 1983.  The downtown and other areas of Kingman were evaluated for historic resources in a 1985 study, the Kingman Multiple Resources Area study.  The study identified 63 historic resources in Kingman and led to many of them being listed on the National Register of Historic Places in 1986. The county courthouse and jail, a 1928-built locomotive (the Santa Fe 3759), a World War II gunnery school radio tower, and about 50 various houses and other buildings in Kingman are listed on the National Register, comprising the majority of National Register listings in Mohave County.

Geography
Kingman is in central Mohave County, along Interstate 40 and U.S. Route 93. The city is served by three exits on I-40, which leads east  to Flagstaff and southwest  to Needles, California. US-93 leads northwest  to Las Vegas and southeast  to Wickenburg,  from Phoenix.

Climate
Kingman sits on the eastern edge of the Mojave Desert, but it is located in a cold desert climate (Köppen BWk) due to its plateau location. Kingman's higher elevation and location between the Colorado Plateau and the Lower Colorado River Valley keeps summer high temperatures away from the extremes ( or more) experienced by Phoenix and the Colorado River Valley. The higher elevation also contributes to winter cold and occasional snowfall. Summer daytime highs reach above  frequently, but rarely exceed .

On December 31, 2014 and January 1, 2015, Kingman received 6.5 inches of snow. The storm was so significant that it was a contributing factor for closing Interstate 40 at the US 93 Junction for 24 hours.

Demographics

At the 2000 census, there were 20,069 people, 7,854 households and 5,427 families residing in the city. The racial make-up of the city was 88.0% White, <0.1% Black or African American, 1.0% Native American, 0.1% Asian, 0.1% Pacific Islander, 3.4% from other races and 3.1% from two or more races. Hispanic or Latino people of any race comprised 12.2% of the population.

There were 7,854 households, of which 30.1% had children under the age of 18 living with them, 54.6% were married couples living together, 10.1% had a female householder with no husband present, and 30.9% were non-families. 25.5% of all households were made up of individuals, and 11.7% had someone living alone who was 65 years of age or older. The average household size was 2.47 and the average family size was 2.94.

25.0% of the population were under the age of 18, 7.4% from 18 to 24, 25.6% from 25 to 44, 24.2% from 45 to 64 and 17.8% who were 65 years of age or older. The median age was 40 years. For every 100 females, there were 97.5 males. For every 100 females age 18 and over, there were 94.4 males.

The median household income was $34,086 and the median family income was $41,327. Males had a median income of $32,036 and females $21,134. The per capita income was $17,181. About 8.2% of families and 11.6% of the population were below the poverty line, including 15.3% of those under age 18 and 7.9% of those age 65 or over.

Government and infrastructure
The city operates under the council-manager form of government. The city council, which is the policymaking and legitimate authority, consists of a mayor, vice-mayor, a five member council and the city manager. The mayor is Ken Watkins  and the vice-mayor seat is vacant. The city council consists of five elected officials – councilmembers SueAnn Mello, Jamie Scott Stehly, Deana Nelson, Cherish Sammeli and Keith Walker. The city manager is Ron Foggin. The city attorney is Carl Cooper.

The city government also includes boards and commissions that assist the council in decision making. They are the:
 Clean City Commission
 Economic Development & Marketing Commission
 Golf Course Advisory Commission
 Historical Preservation Commission
 Municipal Utilities Commission
 Parks and Recreations Commission
 Planning and Zoning Commission
 Transit Advisory Commission
 Tourism Development Commission
 Youth Advisory Commission
 Tri-City Council

Arizona State Prison – Kingman, a privately run prison of the Arizona Department of Corrections, is located in unincorporated Mohave County near Kingman.

The United States Department of the Interior Bureau of Land Management has a field office located in Kingman.

Mohave County Superior Court is located in Kingman.

Mohave County Administration offices are located in Kingman.

The Mohave County Fairgrounds are located in Kingman.

Economy

Top employers
According to Kingman's 2019 Comprehensive Annual Financial Report, the top employers in the city are:

Infrastructure

Transportation

Major highways
  Interstate 40
  U.S. Route 93
  Arizona State Route 66
  Business Loop 40 and Arizona SR 66 are composed of the remnants of what was  U.S. Route 66.
  Arizona State Route 68
  Interstate 11 is proposed to replace U.S. Route 93.

Airport
The airport was originally built as Kingman Army Air Field during World War II and was the location of the Kingman Aerial Gunnery School. The airport was turned over to Mohave County for civilian use in 1949. There are air ambulance and air charter services, but no commercial flights. The Kingman airport now primarily exists as a location for long-term aircraft storage due to its suitable large ramp space and a long, decommissioned runway. Kingman is a non-towered airport.

Rail
Located downtown, the Kingman station station has daily services on Amtrak's Amtrak Southwest Chief  between Los Angeles and Chicago. The historically significant station is constructed in Mission Revival style. Prior to the establishment of Amtrak in 1971, the building had fallen into disrepair. A total renovation was completed in 2010. The station houses a model railroad museum. Amtrak Thruway Motorcoach offers connecting service to Las Vegas.

Kingman is located on the Southern Transcon route of the BNSF Railway which is the main transcontinental route between Los Angeles and Chicago, which carries approximately 100 to 150 freight trains per day.

In August 2012, the Kingman Terminal Railroad (KGTR) opened at the Kingman Airport Authority and Industrial Park. The KGTR is a short line railroad owned by Patriot Rail. Patriot Rail owns and operates 13 railroads in 13 states across the U.S. The KGTR interchanges with BNSF and delivers to businesses at the industrial park.

Buses and shuttles
The City of Kingman operates Kingman Area Regional Transit. Kingman is served by the intercity bus companies Greyhound and TUFESA. FlixBus boards from a stop at 915 W Beale St. Tri-State Shuttle connects Kingman with Harry Reid International Airport in Paradise.

Water
The water system uses groundwater. The same aquifer serving the city is used by the industrial agriculture in the surrounding desert.

Education
Kingman has one public school district, one charter school district and one Christian school.

Public schools
Kingman Unified School District (KUSD) consists of 12 schools, ranging from Kindergarten to high school.

Elementary schools
 Hualapai Elementary School
 Cerbat Elementary School
 Palo Christi Elementary School (closed)
 Black Mountain Elementary School (located in the neighboring town of Golden Valley)
 La Senita Elementary School
 Manzanita Elementary School
 Desert Willow Elementary School
 Kingman Academy of Learning Primary/Intermediate School

Middle schools
 Golden Valley Middle School
 Kingman Middle School
 White Cliffs Middle School
 Kingman Academy of Learning Middle School

High schools
 Kingman High School
 Lee Williams High School
 Kingman Academy of Learning High School

K–12
 Mt. Tipton School, a KUSD K–12 school, is located in Dolan Springs, approximately 30 miles northwest of Kingman.

Other schools
 The Kingman Academy of Learning, a charter school, is split into four schools: a primary (pre-school – 2nd grade), intermediate (3–5), middle (6–8), and high school (9–12).
 The Emmanuel Christian Academy teaches students from kindergarten to 8th grade.

Post-secondary education
 One of four main campuses, Mohave Community College, a junior college, is located in Kingman.
 Northern Arizona University has an extension campus located in Kingman.

Notable people

 Andy Devine (1905–1977), actor, was raised in Kingman, where his father opened the Beale Hotel. One of the major streets of Kingman is named "Andy Devine Avenue" and the town holds the annual "Andy Devine Days".
 Michael Fortier, Timothy McVeigh's co-conspirator, lived in Kingman from the age of seven.
 Miki Garcia, model and Playboy magazine's Playmate for the January 1973 issue, was born in Kingman.
 Doris Hill (1905–1976), born Roberta M. Hill, was an American film actress of the 1920s and 1930s.
 Paul Kalanithi (1977–2015), neurosurgeon and writer, was raised in Kingman.
 Timothy McVeigh (1968–2001), who carried out the Oklahoma City bombing, was a resident of Kingman for various periods between 1993 and 1995.
 Doug Mirabelli, former Boston Red Sox catcher, was born in Kingman.
 Aron Ra, atheist activist, regional director of American Atheists, and public speaker, was born in Kingman.
 Joseph Rosenberg, bank executive, worked as a banker in Kingman before moving to Los Angeles. Rosenberg was later Walt Disney's banker.
 Tarik Skubal, MLB pitcher for the Detroit Tigers.
 Karen Steele, actress, lived and died in Kingman.

In popular culture

Off screen
 Clark Gable and Carole Lombard were married at the rectory of Saint John's Methodist Episcopal Church in 1939, during a break in the shooting of Gone with the Wind.

Onscreen
Kingman has been used as a filming location for several movies and television shows.

In films
 The films Roadhouse 66 and Two-Lane Blacktop were shot in Kingman.
 The movie Management takes place but was not shot in Kingman.
 Scenes from the movie Fear and Loathing in Las Vegas were filmed at the Kingman Airport; in the scene, it is possible to see a clear shot of the Hualapai Mountains.
 Scenes from the 1992 movie Universal Soldier were filmed in the downtown area as well as a local grocery store and at the Kingman Airport.

In television
 In "Otis", an episode from the television series Prison Break, LJ Burrows is sent to an adult facility in Kingman, Arizona. In a subsequent episode, "Buried", LJ is released from the aforementioned facility.
 In "Native Tongue", an episode from the television series "Medium" (NBC: 2005–09; CBS: 2009–2011), Alison has a dream about a man being threatened to be burned alive unless he revels the whereabouts of something the killer wants. The man tells the killer that 'it' is near Kingman, where his partner lives. As the story progresses, it is discovered that the man is associated with the Navajo Reservation located 20 E of Kingman.
 In the HBO series The Sopranos, when Tony Soprano was shot at the beginning of season 6, he fell into a coma and believed he was involved in a case of mistaken identity with Kevin Finnerty who lived in Kingman (see "Join the Club").
 In "The Locomotion Interruption," the season 8 premiere of The Big Bang Theory, Sheldon Cooper finds his belongings stolen at Kingman train station.
 In episode 2 of the Showtime political satire documentary Who Is America?, residents of the town are shown making anti-Muslim and anti-black statements when told by a disguised Sacha Baron Cohen that a mosque would be built in Kingman.

In literature and publications
 The town is mentioned in Barbara Kingsolver's novel Pigs in Heaven.
 In the post-apocalyptic novel Warday, Kingman is the "point of entry" to California; the Golden State, spared by the nuclear attacks that hit much of the rest of the country, is strictly guarded by troops, and "illegals" are jailed.

In music
 The town is mentioned in the lyrics of Bobby Troup's song "Route 66".

Points of interest
 Hualapai Mountain Recreation Area,  to the southeast of Kingman

References

External links

 
 
 The Kingman Daily Miner
 

 
Cities in Mohave County, Arizona
County seats in Arizona
U.S. Route 66 in Arizona
Populated places established in 1882
1882 establishments in Arizona Territory
Cities in Arizona